Social Philosophy Today is a peer-reviewed interdisciplinary journal sponsored by the North American Society for Social Philosophy. It was established in 1988 by founding editors Yeager Hudson and Creighton Peden. The journal provides a forum for in-depth discussion of contemporary social issues. Each issue includes peer-reviewed papers drawn from those presented at the International Social Philosophy Conference, the annual event of the North American Society for Social Philosophy. The journal also accepts original submissions not previously submitted to the International Social Philosophy Conference but which address the conference theme or respond to previously published Social Philosophy Today articles. The journal is published by the Philosophy Documentation Center.

Abstracting and indexing 
Social Philosophy Today is abstracted and indexed in:

See also 
 List of philosophy journals
 List of political science journals

References

External links 
 

English-language journals
Social philosophy journals
Publications established in 1988
Annual journals
Political science journals
Philosophy Documentation Center academic journals